"Put Your Hands Up" is the second single from DJ Khaled’s fourth studio album Victory. The track features American rappers Young Jeezy, Plies, Rick Ross and Schife. It was officially released on February 8, 2010 along with "All I Do Is Win". The album version featuring an additional verse by Plies after Young Jeezy's part, which is the official remix.

Music video
The video has a spinning camera filming Young Jeezy, Rick Ross and Schife rapping their parts, in the middle of a big circle of people.  Fat Joe and Ace Hood make cameos in the music video.
Plies
is not included in this video. The video premiered on BET's 106 & Park on March 3, 2010- along with the music video for "All I Do Is Win".

Charts

References

2009 songs
2010 singles
DJ Khaled songs
Rick Ross songs
Plies (rapper) songs
Jeezy songs
Songs written by Plies (rapper)
Songs written by Rick Ross
Songs written by Jeezy
Songs written by DJ Khaled
MNRK Music Group singles